Eskadrille 721 of the Royal Danish Air Force is the sole squadron in 'Air Transport Wing Aalborg' of the Danish Defence. It provides tactical transport for all parts of the Danish state.

History
Eskadrille 721 (721 Squadron) was formed on 1 October 1950, when the Royal Danish Air Force (Flyvevåbnet) was formed by merging the Marinens Flyvevæsen (Danish Naval Air Service) and Hærens Flyvertropper (Danish Army Air Corps), with Eskadrille 721 incorporating the aircraft of the 1st and 2nd Luftflotille of the Naval Air Service, together with the Greenland flight of the Army Air Corps, with the role of transport (including support for operations in Greenland, together with Search and Rescue operations.

Present activity

Since 2004 the air wing is located at Flyvestation Aalborg, in the Northern part of Jutland peninsula.

The main role for the air wing is to provide tactical transport capacity with its C-130's.
The Challengers provide both VIP-transportation for the Royal Court of Denmark and other government officials, and has the option to be equipped with airborne radar for surveillance.

Current equipment

Currently Eskadrille 721 operates:

 4 Lockheed C-130J Super Hercules
 4 Bombardier CL-604 Challenger
 4 Saab T-17 Supporter

See also
 Danish Defence

References

 Augustesen, Sören. "Denmark's Challengers". Air International, April 2015, Vol. 88, No. 4. pp. 82–85.
 Nikolajsen, O. "Arctic Specialists: History of No.721 Squadron, Royal Danish Air Force". Air Pictorial, January 1970, Vol. 32, No. 1. pp. 16–18.

External links
About Eskadrille 721 (in Danish)

Danish Air Force squadrons